The Córdoba offensive was a failed Republican offensive against the Nationalist held city of Cordoba. It took place from 19 to 22 August 1936 during the Spanish Civil War.

Background.
On 18 July, the military governor of Cordoba, Ciriaco Cascajo, started the coup in the city, bombing the civil government and arresting the civil governor, Rodriguez de Leon. After that, he and the civil guard officer Bruno Ibañez, Don Bruno, carried out a bloody repression (in the first weeks, 2,000 persons were executed).
In the second week of August, the Nationalist troops were reinforced by 400 regulares who, led by Colonel Varela, after the capture of Huelva, launched an attack eastwards from Seville in order to relieve the besieged nationalist-held city of Granada. After a corridor to the city was established, Varela prepared to attack Malaga. At that point, the Republican Army launched an attack in order to recover Córdoba.

The offensive
The Republican force, led by General Miaja, was composed of 3,000 men, mainly regular troops, civil guards, militiamen from Madrid and local volunteers. Opposing them, the Nationalists had the small force of the Nationalist commander in Cordoba, Colonel Cascajo, and the column of Colonel Varela. The Nationalists also had one DC-2 and several Sa-81 bombers.

The advance of Miaja's force had started on 5 August but its advance was very slow and only occupied small towns like Adamuz and Pozoblanco. The Republican attack against Cordoba itself started on 20 August. The Republican troops reached the gates of Cordoba (5 km from the city), but they were beaten back and the attack failed on 22 August. According to Thomas, the offensive failed because of the skillful use of the Italian Savoia bombers and because Cascajo threatened to execute the family of Miaja who were in Cordoba. According to Beevor, the attack failed because of the incompetence of Miaja and the Republican professional officers. Furthermore, many of Miaja's officers were, in fact, Nationalist supporters (Miaja's adjutant was hoping to cross the lines, and on 23 August one captain, Antonio Reparaz, deserted with 200 civil guards).

Aftermath
Nationalist repression in the towns briefly occupied by the Republicans was very harsh. In the town of Palma del Rio, a local landowner killed 300 supporters of the Republic (the Republicans had killed 42 supporters of the Nationalists there). After a nationalist counter-offensive in September, the Cordoba front was stabilised.

See also 

 List of Spanish Republican military equipment of the Spanish Civil War
 List of Spanish Nationalist military equipment of the Spanish Civil War

References

Bibliography 

 
 
 

Battles of the Spanish Civil War
1936 in Spain
Conflicts in 1936
History of Córdoba, Spain
Province of Córdoba (Spain)
August 1936 events